The 2004 NCAA Division I Men's Basketball Championship Game was the finals of the 2004 NCAA Division I men's basketball tournament and it determined the national champion for the 2003-04 NCAA Division I men's basketball season  The 2004 National Title Game was played on April 5, 2004 at the Alamodome in San Antonio, Texas, The 2004 National Title Game was played between the 2004 Phoenix Regional Champions, #2-seeded Connecticut and the 2004 St. Louis Regional Champions, #3-seeded Georgia Tech.

Connecticut and Georgia Tech met in the semifinals of the 2003 NIT Season Tip-Off and Georgia Tech upset #1-ranked Connecticut with a 77–61 win on their way to winning the 2003 NIT Season Tip-Off.

Participants

Georgia Tech

Georgia Tech entered the 2004 NCAA tournament as the #3 seed in the St. Louis regional. In the 1st round of the 2004 NCAA Tournament, Georgia Tech survived a scare against Northern Iowa when Ben Jacobson missed a game-tying 3-pointer as Georgia Tech was able to pull away with a 65–60 win. In the 2nd round of the 2004 NCAA Tournament, Jarrett Jack made a breakaway dunk with less than six seconds left to hold off Boston College with a 57–54 victory. In the Sweet 16, Marvin Lewis scored 23 points to lead Georgia Tech to a 72–67 victory over Nevada to advance to the Elite Eight. In the Elite Eight, Jarrett Jack scored 29 points to lead Georgia Tech to a 79–71 overtime victory over Kansas to advance to the 2004 Final Four. In the 2004 Final Four, Will Bynum made a last second shot to give Georgia Tech a 67–65 victory over Oklahoma State and a trip to the 2004 National Title Game.

Connecticut

Connecticut entered the 2004 NCAA tournament as the #2 seed in the Phoenix Regional. In the 1st round of the 2004 NCAA Tournament, Emeka Okafor had a double double with 15 points and 14 rebounds and he was able to limit the nations third-leading scorer Taylor Coppenrath to 12 points as Connecticut beat Vermont 70–53. In the 2nd round of the 2004 NCAA Tournament, Connecticut was able to beat DePaul 72-55 despite their coach Jim Calhoun having an upset stomach. In the Sweet 16, Ben Gordon scored 20 points to lead Connecticut to a 73–53 victory over Vanderbilt. In the Elite Eight, Emeka Okafor only scored two points due to a tweaked shoulder but Ben Gordon's 36 points and Rashad Anderson's 28 points led Connecticut to an 87–71 victory over Alabama for a trip to the 2004 Final Four. In the 2004 Final Four, Emeka Okafor scored all 18 of his points in the 2nd half as he led Connecticut to a 12–0 run, down 75–67 with less than three minuted remaining, to beat Duke 79-78 and advance to the 2004 National Title Game making their 1st title game appearance since 1999.

Starting lineups

Game summary

Emeka Okafor and Ben Gordon go hot in the 1st half. Ben Gordon hit three three-pointers in the 1st ten minutes while Emeka Okafor dominated Georgia Tech center Luke Schenscher in the lane. Emeka Okafor and Ben Gordon nearly outscored Georgia Tech in the 1st half scoring 24 points combined in the 1st half while Georgia Tech scored 26 points in the 1st half as Connecticut was ahead 41–26 at halftime. Georgia Tech could not take advantage of Ben Gordon being on the bench after his 2nd foul. In fact, Connecticut was able to extend their lead with Ben Gordon on the bench. Connecticut was able to build a 25-point lead at one point. When Connecticut backed off and slowed the game down, Georgia Tech was able to make a furious rally to cut it to a seven-point deficit. Connecticut was able to hold off Georgia Tech and with 24 points and 15 rebounds from Emeka Okafor and 21 points from Ben Gordon, as Connecticut beat Georgia Tech 82–73.

Aftermath
Thousands of people in Connecticut celebrated after Connecticut's victory in the men's National Championship Game, which finished about two hours after the UConn women's team defeated archrival Tennessee for the women's national title. Fans were dancing, cheering, and waving pom poms. However, 35 people were arrested by the police for starting fires and overturning cars in celebration of Connecticut's second men's and fifth women's national championships. The university police reported that a dozen of fires were set outside and two cars were overturned at the Celeron Square apartment complex about a mile month of campus following Connecticut's victory over Georgia Tech.

Connecticut became the first school ever in Division I to win NCAA titles in men's and women's basketball in the same season. The Huskies would repeat this feat in 2014.

References

NCAA Division I Men's Basketball Championship Game
NCAA Division I Men's Basketball Championship Games
UConn Huskies men's basketball
Georgia Tech Yellow Jackets men's basketball
College basketball tournaments in Texas
Basketball competitions in San Antonio
NCAA Division I Men's Basketball Championship Game
NCAA Division I Men's Basketball Championship Game
21st century in San Antonio